Oscar Wight (10 August 1906 – 13 September 1986) was a Guyanese cricketer. He played in fifteen first-class matches for British Guiana from 1926 to 1938.

See also
 List of Guyanese representative cricketers

References

External links
 

1906 births
1986 deaths
Guyanese cricketers
Guyana cricketers
Sportspeople from Georgetown, Guyana